Stephen Fisher-King is an Australian musician and entertainer and has performed lead roles in operas including La bohème, The Coronation of Poppea and Dido and Aeneas and Australian productions of Hello Dolly, Evita and Cats and toured Australasia alongside Sarah Brightman in The Music of Andrew Lloyd Webber.

Early life
Stephen was born and grew up in Canberra, Australian Capital Territory and is one of four children. He began singing lessons when he was nine years old.

Discography

Albums

Awards

Mo Awards
The Australian Entertainment Mo Awards (commonly known informally as the Mo Awards), were annual Australian entertainment industry awards. They recognise achievements in live entertainment in Australia from 1975 to 2016. Fisher-King has won 9 awards in that time.
 (wins only)
|-
| 1995
| Stephen Fisher-King
| Male Variety Performer of the Year 
| 
|-
|rowspan="2"| 1996
| Stephen Fisher-King
| Variety Performer of the Year 
| 
|-
| Stephen Fisher-King
| Male Variety Performer of the Year 
| 
|-
|rowspan="2"| 1997
| Stephen Fisher-King
| Variety Performer of the Year 
| 
|-
| Stephen Fisher-King
| Male Variety Performer of the Year 
| 
|-
| 1998
| Stephen Fisher-King
| Male Variety Performer of the Year 
| 
|-
| 1999
| Stephen Fisher-King
| Male Variety Performer of the Year 
| 
|-
| 2001
| Stephen Fisher-King
| Male Variety Performer of the Year 
| 
|-
| 2003
| Stephen Fisher-King
| Male Variety Performer of the Year 
| 
|-

References 

Living people
Australian male actors
Year of birth missing (living people)